Nadawah is a ghost town in Monroe County, Alabama.

History
Nadawah was named for the Nadawah Lumber Company. The Nadawah Lumber Company operated 15 miles of standard-gauge railway from 1912 to 1928. Nadawah was formerly a sawmill town in the early 20th century, located about a mile south of Wilcox County and seven miles from Beatrice. The town was near the head of Flat Creek, along the Louisville & Nashville Railroad (L&N). Besides the sawmill, it had a post office, school, hotel and stores. A post office operated under the name Nadawah from 1900 to 1967. Little exists of the community today.

Demographics

Nadawah appeared on the U.S. Censuses of 1920 and 1930 as an incorporated community. It disincorporated at some point in the 1930s.

Geography

References

Ghost towns in Alabama